The following list includes notable people who were born or have lived in Arlington Heights, Illinois. For a similar list organized alphabetically by last name, see the category page People from Arlington Heights, Illinois.

Entertainment

Business

Music

Sports

Baseball

Basketball

Football

Hockey

Soccer

Wrestling

References

Arlington Heights
Arlington Heights